A float is a form of two-wheeled horse-drawn cart with a dropped axle to give an especially low load-bed.

They were intended for carrying heavy or unstable items such as milk churns. The name survives today in that of the milk float and carnival float.

The axle passes beneath the load-bed of the cart but was cranked upwards at each side. This allows the load to be carried low, for stability and ease of loading with heavy objects such as churns or barrels. The high position of the stub axles allows large wheels, giving a smooth ride. The box body is often open at the rear, with no more than a chain across for safety. Rather than a driving seat or box, they are driven from a standing position, alongside the load. Floats were drawn by a single horse or, especially in Ireland, a donkey.

See also
 Brewer's dray

References 

Carts
Animal-powered vehicles